This is a list of Nigerian films released in 1995.

Films

See also 

 List of Nigerian films

References

External links 

 1995 films at the Internet Movie Database

1995
Lists of 1995 films by country or language
1995 in Nigeria
1990s in Nigerian cinema